Owen Burrows (17 October 1903 – 4 January 1984) was an Australian cricketer. He played 32 first-class matches between 1923 and 1937, mostly for Tasmania. 

Burrows was a pacy opening bowler and useful lower-order batsman. In the 1929–30 season he played a match for Woodfull's XI versus Ryder's XI. His best bowling figures were 5 for 35 in Tasmania's victory over Victoria in 1931-32. In a senior Hobart club match in November 1925, Burrows bowled a ball that, in dismissing a batsman, knocked a bail 83 yards 1 foot 9 inches (76.43 metres), which is believed to be a world record.

See also
 List of Tasmanian representative cricketers

References

External links
 

1903 births
1984 deaths
Australian cricketers
Tasmania cricketers
Cricketers from Hobart